The title of Detroit Grand Prix was applied to the Formula One races held at the Detroit street circuit in Detroit, Michigan, United States of America from 1982 through 1988.

History
In 1982, the U.S. became the first country to host three World Championship Grands Prix in one season. In addition to the United States Grand Prix West in Long Beach and the Las Vegas races, the new event was held in Detroit, Michigan on another street course encompassing the Renaissance Center, current headquarters of General Motors. This record was not equated until 2020, when Italy hosted three Grands Prix in one season (the traditional Italian Grand Prix at Monza, as well one-off events the Tuscan Grand Prix at the Mugello Circuit and Emilia Romagna Grand Prix at the Autodromo Internazionale Enzo e Dino Ferrari), as a byproduct of a rescheduling due to the COVID-19 pandemic.

The original circuit had seventeen corners in 2.493 miles, including two very tricky hairpins and a tunnel that enclosed a gentle right-hand bend next to the river, and proved to be even slower than Monaco.

Detroit got off to a bad start in 1982 due to organization problems. Practice planned for Thursday was cancelled, and the first qualifying session on Friday had to be postponed. There was time for only a one-hour practice session on Friday, and so qualifying would take place on Saturday in two one-hour sessions, four hours apart. Saturday was cold and overcast with a very real threat of rain, and nearly all the drivers scrambled to get a time in on the dry track while they could, with many spins and trips down the escape roads of the unfamiliar circuit. The afternoon session was wet throughout, as expected, and the times from the morning session did indeed determine the grid.

The race soon gained a reputation for being horrendously demanding and grueling, with the very bumpy track often breaking up badly under the consistently hot and very humid weather; it was perhaps the single hardest race on car and driver in Formula One during the 1980s – this race often produced races of attrition and the narrow track would often result in a large number of cars retiring during the race due to mechanical breakage or contact with the concrete walls. Brakes and gearboxes in particular were tested to their breaking points – the drivers had to brake hard more than 20 times per lap and change gear around 50 to 60 times in one lap (cars had five-speed manual gearboxes in those days) – for 62 laps usually lasting around 1 minute and 45 seconds, which often meant races always lasted close to two hours. And like Monaco, if a driver put a wheel out of line or made even the slightest mistake, the punishment, mechanical or on time – was very harsh and almost always absolute. 1982 and 1983 were races held in early June, but from 1984 to 1988, the race was held in late June, when the temperature difference is considerable in Detroit for a two-week timeframe – weather conditions are considerably hotter and generally less pleasant in Detroit around late June. At least half of the field retired in each race; it was often considered an achievement if a driver could finish this race, let alone win it.

Although the weather and track breakup in 1986 and 1987 was not as intense as it had been in 1984 and 1985, Detroit was removed from the Formula One schedule after  after F1's governing body FISA declared the temporary pit area wasn't up to the required standard. FISA and FOCA wanted a permanent pits facility, but the City of Detroit was not willing to spend the money to build such facilities. The 1988 race was a very hot race, and the circuit broke up very badly – this was the worst state the circuit had ever been in – even worse than 1984 and 1985. Such track problems often occurred, but the track disintegration was worse that year due to the intense heat and humidity. The race had always been the hardest race of the year, terribly difficult on the car and driver – but by now, the race had worn out its welcome and it had become downright unpleasant. The race was already unpopular among drivers, and as a result, a number of drivers after the Grand Prix that year had finally had enough and they became outspoken with their dislike of the event. For the  season, it was originally planned to move the F1 Grand Prix to a new circuit at Belle Isle. However, an agreement could not be established, and the only American Grand Prix of the year moved to Phoenix for 1989–1991, which was known as the United States Grand Prix, the first official USGP to be run since the 1980 race at Watkins Glen in New York. Upon the departure of F1, the Detroit race was replaced by the CART-sanctioned Detroit Indy Grand Prix which in 1992 moved to the Belle Isle circuit originally proposed for F1.

Winners

Repeat winners (drivers)

Repeat winners (constructors)
Teams in bold are competing in the Formula One championship in the current season.

Repeat winners (engine manufacturers)
Manufacturers in bold are competing in the Formula One championship in the current season.

* Built by Cosworth

By year

Lap records
 Qualifying: 1:38.301 – Ayrton Senna, Lotus-Renault, 1986
 Race: 1:40.464 – Ayrton Senna, Lotus-Honda, 1987

See also
 List of Formula One Championship events
 United States Grand Prix
 Grand Prix of America
 United States Grand Prix West
 Caesars Palace Grand Prix
 Dallas Grand Prix
 Detroit Belle Isle Grand Prix

References

 
Formula One Grands Prix
Recurring sporting events established in 1982
Motorsport in Michigan
1982 establishments in Michigan
Recurring sporting events disestablished in 1988